Second Lieutenant A.P.N.C. De Vaas Gunawardene, SLLI was a Sri Lankan Army officer who commanded the ill-fated Four Four Bravo patrol that was ambushed by the LTTE July 23, 1983. This incident sparked the Black July riots and is considered to be the start of the Sri Lankan Civil War.

Education and Military career
Educated at Ananda College, Colombo, Vaas Gunawardene joined the Sri Lanka Army in 1980 as an Officer cadet and received his training at the Officers Training School, Madras. He was commissioned as a Second Lieutenant in the Sri Lanka Light Infantry. In 1983 he was attached to the C Company of the First Battalion, SLLI Madagal, Jaffna.

Ambush
Patrol Four Four Bravo was scheduled to leave Gurunagar (code name Four Four) at 2200 hours as a routine patrol from the C Company of the 1st Battalion of the Sri Lanka Light Infantry based at Madagal about 20 miles away. The patrol arrived at 2147 hours. It consisted of a detachment of 15 soldiers led by Second Lieutenant A.P.N.C. De S. Vaas Gunawardene. The instructions of the Brigadier Lyle Balthazar, were that the patrol should be back in Madagal before 2359 hours, if necessary shortening the prescribed route: Gurunagar - Jaffna - Naga Vihara - Nallur - Kopay - Urumpirai - Kondavil - Kokuvil - Jaffna- Kaliyan - kadu - Madagal. 2nd Lt. Gunawardene received the instructions from Major De Silva who further emphasized that the patrol must be in Madagal Camp by midnight. Four Four Bravo left Gurunagar at 2206 hours and was in radio contact every five minutes all reports indicated that Jaffna was quiet.

On the July 23, a patrol, call sign Four Four Bravo left their battalion HQ on a routine patrol. Sellakili of the LTTE was planning on getting revenge for the death of Charles Lucas Anthony aka Seelan and had observed the army patrols. That night a group of 25 LTTE men, including Velupillai Prabhakaran, Kittu, Iyer, Victor, Pulendran, Shellakili, Santhosam and Appiah gathered at Tinneveli on the Palali - Jaffna road at a point where the road was dug up to install new telecommunication equipment. Near one such excavation four mines were placed and a plunger stolen from the Kankesanturai Cement Factory was placed on the balcony of a nearby house. A machine gun nests were placed near the exploder and across the road. The force was split in two and placed on both sides of the road with Sellakili present.

At 2328 hours the patrol reported that it was leaving Urumpirai junction and everything was quiet. The patrol was made up of a jeep with 2nd Lt. Vaas Gunawardene, Private N.A.S. Manutange driving and Corporal G.D. Perera and Private S.S. Amarasinghe, Private S.P.G. Rajatillake and Private K.P. Karunaratne in the rear and a Tata Benz half truck with the rest of the patrol with Sergeant S.I. Thelakaratne in the front seat with Corporal G.R. Perera at the wheel and Private A.J.R. Fernando between them. Five minutes of leaving Urumpirai the Jeep was slowing down near Tinneveli because of the obstruction on the road due to the installation of telecommunication equipment. As it was passing the excavation on the road, the exploder set off the mines, followed by a hail of machine gun fire on the Jeep and the half-truck. The explosion of the mines wounded many of the men in the jeep including 2nd Lt. Vaas Gunawardene who leapt out of the Jeep and pulled out a hand grenade, but was mowed down by machine gun fire. The rest in the jeep scrambled out attacked the enemy with hand grenades before being killed. Cpl. C.D. Perera charged at the enemy firing his SLR, his body was found a short distance from the jeep.

On witnessing the explosion the half truck stooped and it too came under fire from both parties of the terrorist. The fire killed Cpl. Perera in the driver's seat, Private Robert, Sunil and Wijesiri in the rear and wounded Private Manapitiya. Sgt. Thelakaratne and Private Fernando who were both wounded scrambled out, took cover from the vehicle and opened fire, however Fernando was soon killed. Thilakaratne kept firing until home-made grenade blew off one hand and all but blew off one foot. Cpl. R. A. U. Perera and Cpl. Sumathipala kept on firing and the latter in addition lobbed his grenade. In his dying moments Private Manapitiya gave his grenade to the Cpl. Sumathipala who changed their magazines and kept on the pressure on the enemy. At one stage they alighted from the vehicle and kept on firing at the enemy in two different directions thus pinning them down. At 2340 hours a message was sent to Brigadier Balthazar that radio contact with the patrol was lost and that a sentry had heard gunfire and explosions in the distance. The Army camps in Palali, Madagal, Thondamanar and Velvettiturai were alerted and the ambush prepared for Four Four Charlie was canceled by Brigadier Balthazar. It was sent in search of Four Four Bravo.

Four Four Charlie located the destroyed vehicles at 0009 hours and reported in. Cpl. R. A. U. Perera also telephoned from the Kondavil CTB Depot about that time. He had fired till he ran out ammunition there after retreated, wounded in both legs. He gave the location of Cpl. Sumathipala, who had also fired till his ammunition was almost expended, and thereafter had retreated and was lying wounded. Brigadier Balthazar himself reached the location, and found Sgt. Thelakaratne in critical condition and sent him to the hospital. He died on the way.

References

External links
Flashback: Tinneveli, July 1983: The aftermath in Colombo

Sri Lanka Light Infantry officers
Sri Lanka Military Academy graduates
1961 births
1983 deaths
Sinhalese military personnel